National Heroes Square, formerly Trafalgar Square, is located in Bridgetown, the capital and principal commercial centre of the island-nation of Barbados.  The square lies along Upper Broad Street and is on the northern shore of the Careenage ("Constitution River"), found directly in the centre of Bridgetown.

Name
The current name of National Heroes Square was adopted on 22 April 1999 and officially took effect on 28 April 1999. The name refers to the Barbadian National Heroes.

In 2009, the government of David Thompson opened up a proposal to rename the circle found in the Historic Landmark square as "Parliament Circle", and to completely redevelop and reconfigure the Square's layout.

Statue of Lord Nelson

A fixture of the Square on the west-end included a bronze statue of British naval hero Vice Admiral Horatio, Lord Nelson.  The statue in Bridgetown was unveiled on 22 March 1813 to commemorate the anniversary of the British Royal Navy's victory in the Battle of Trafalgar in 1805.  The local statue of Lord Nelson in Bridgetown was erected approximately 27 years before the more famous Nelson's Column in London, which serves as the centrepiece of Trafalgar Square.

As a point of reference, the statue of Nelson served as the geographic centre of Bridgetown. Since the colonial period many distances on the island from Bridgetown have historically been measured from the base of Nelson's statue, so that the statue functioned as Barbados' mile zero. The use of the Bajan Nelson statue as a centring point is similar to the London statue in the British Capital; however Trafalgar Square is adjacent to the actual historic and geographic centre of London, which is actually located, immediately to the east, in Charing Cross. The monument which serves as London's exact centre is therefore not of Nelson, but the equestrian statue of Charles I, at Charing Cross, facing down Whitehall, standing where the Queen Eleanor Memorial Cross had previously stood before being moved to the Charing Cross railway station forecourt.

Gallery

References

External links
Photo of Lord Nelson statue located in Bridgetown
Aerial view of Trafalgar Square in Barbados

Buildings and structures in Bridgetown
Squares in Barbados
National squares
1813 establishments in the British Empire